This is a list of places in Poland having standing links to local communities in other countries known as "town twinning" (usually in Europe) or "sister cities" (usually in the rest of the world), in Polish miasta partnerskie.

A
Aleksandrów Łódzki

 Krāslava, Latvia
 Ossiach, Austria
 Puget-Ville, France

Andrychów

 Břeclav, Czech Republic
 Isny im Allgäu, Germany
 Izium, Ukraine
 Khoni, Georgia
 Landgraaf, Netherlands
 Priverno, Italy
 Storozhynets, Ukraine
 Tukums, Latvia

Augustów

 Druskininkai, Lithuania
 Porto Ceresio, Italy
 Rudky, Ukraine
 Supraśl, Poland
 Tuusula, Finland

B

Ba–Bi
Barlinek

 Gryfino, Poland
 Courrières, France
 Prenzlau, Germany
 Schneverdingen, Germany

Bartoszyce

 Berezne, Ukraine
 Emmaboda, Sweden
 Mława, Poland
 Nienburg, Germany
 Varėna, Lithuania

Będzin

 Basse-Ham, France
 Kaišiadorys, Lithuania
 Obukhiv, Ukraine
 Tatabánya, Hungary

Bełchatów

 Alcobaça, Portugal
 Aubergenville, France
 Csongrád, Hungary
 Děčín, Czech Republic
 Myślenice, Poland
 Pardubice, Czech Republic
 Považská Bystrica, Slovakia
 Tauragė, Lithuania
 Yuzhnoukrainsk, Ukraine
 Zviahel, Ukraine

Bełżyce

 Báránd, Hungary
 Brody, Ukraine
 Šaštín-Stráže, Slovakia
 Shchyrets, Ukraine

Biała Podlaska

 Baranavichy, Belarus
 Brest, Belarus

Białe Błota

 Elbmarsch, Germany
 Vilnius District Municipality, Lithuania

Białogard

 Albano Laziale, Italy
 Binz, Germany
 Caracal, Romania
 Gnosjö, Sweden
 Jēkabpils, Latvia
 Maardu, Estonia
 Montana, Bulgaria
 Olen, Belgium
 Teterow, Germany

Białystok

 Bălți, Moldova
 Bornova, Turkey
 Chongzuo, China
 Dijon, France
 Dobrich, Bulgaria
 Eindhoven, Netherlands
 Gori, Georgia
 Gyumri, Armenia
 Jelgava, Latvia
 Kaunas, Lithuania
 Lusaka, Zambia
 Lutsk, Ukraine
 Mazara del Vallo, Italy
 Milwaukee County, United States
 Sliema, Malta
 Sumgait, Azerbaijan
 Yehud-Monosson, Israel

Bielawa

 Chatham-Kent, Canada
 Ciechanów, Poland
 Hronov, Czech Republic
 Kostelec nad Orlicí, Czech Republic
 Lingen, Germany

Bielsk Podlaski

 Călăraşi, Moldova
 Călăraşi, Romania
 Dve Mogili, Bulgaria
 Rakhiv, Ukraine

Bielsko-Biała

 Acre, Israel
 Baia Mare, Romania
 Besançon, France
 Berdyansk, Ukraine

 Frýdek-Místek, Czech Republic
 Grand Rapids, United States
 Kirklees, England, United Kingdom
 Kragujevac, Serbia
 Nyíregyháza, Hungary
 Szolnok, Hungary
 Třinec, Czech Republic
 Ustka, Poland
 Wolfsburg, Germany
 Žilina, Slovakia

Bieruń

 Gundelfingen, Germany
 Meung-sur-Loire, France
 Moravský Beroun, Czech Republic
 Ostroh, Ukraine

Biłgoraj

 Afula, Israel
 Bílina, Czech Republic
 Crailsheim, Germany
 Kelmė, Lithuania
 Novovolynsk, Ukraine
 Stropkov, Slovakia

Biskupiec
 Bramsche, Germany

Bo–By
Bochnia

 Bad Salzdetfurth, Germany
 Kežmarok, Slovakia
 Roselle, United States

Bogatynia

 Hrádek nad Nisou, Czech Republic
 Zittau, Germany

Boguchwała

 Bystřice nad Pernštejnem, Czech Republic
 Snina, Slovakia
 Trostianets, Ukraine
 Vranov nad Topľou, Slovakia

Boguszów-Gorce
 Smiřice, Czech Republic

Bolesławiec

 Acuto, Italy
 Česká Lípa, Czech Republic
 Mariagerfjord, Denmark
 Molde, Norway
 Nogent-sur-Marne, France
 Pirna, Germany
 Prnjavor, Bosnia and Herzegovina
 Siegburg, Germany
 Vallecorsa, Italy
 Zbarazh, Ukraine

Bolków

 Bad Muskau, Germany
 Borken, Germany
 Doksy, Czech Republic

Brodnica

 Brørup (Vejen), Denmark
 Kėdainiai, Lithuania

 Strasburg, Germany

Brzeg

 Beroun, Czech Republic
 Bourg-en-Bresse, France
 Goslar, Germany

Brzeg Dolny

 Barsinghausen, Germany

 Kovel, Ukraine
 Mont-Saint-Aignan, France

Brzesko

 Langenenslingen, Germany
 Sovata, Romania
 Százhalombatta, Hungary

Brzozów

 Dobromyl, Ukraine
 Moldava nad Bodvou, Slovakia
 Sambir, Ukraine

Busko-Zdrój

 Khmilnyk, Ukraine
 Specchia, Italy
 Steinheim, Germany
 Sveti Martin na Muri, Croatia
 Szigetszentmiklós, Hungary

Bydgoszcz

 Cherkasy, Ukraine 
 Hartford, United States
 Kragujevac, Serbia
 Kremenchuk, Ukraine 
 Mannheim, Germany
 Ningbo, China
 Patras, Greece
 Pavlodar, Kazakhstan
 Perth, Scotland, United Kingdom
 Pitești, Romania
 Reggio Emilia, Italy
 Wilhelmshaven, Germany

Bystrzyca Kłodzka

 Amberg, Germany
 Kaźmierz, Poland
 Massa Martana, Italy
 Orlické Záhoří, Czech Republic
 Ústí nad Orlicí, Czech Republic
 Zdobnice, Czech Republic

Bytom

 Butte, United States
 Drohobych, Ukraine
 Ormož, Slovenia
 Recklinghausen, Germany
 Vsetín, Czech Republic
 Zhytomyr, Ukraine

Bytów

 Frankenberg, Germany
 Markaryd, Sweden
 Tauragė, Lithuania
 Winona, United States
 Zalischyky, Ukraine

C
Chęciny
 Schöneck, Germany

Chełm

 Knoxville, United States
 Kovel, Ukraine
 Lutsk, Ukraine

 Sindelfingen, Germany
 Utena, Lithuania

Chełmno

 Falkirk, Scotland, United Kingdom
 Hann. Münden, Germany
 Kaniv, Ukraine
 Letovice, Czech Republic

Chojna is a member of the Douzelage, a town twinning association of towns across the European Union. Chojna also has one other twin town.

Douzelage
 Agros, Cyprus
 Altea, Spain
 Asikkala, Finland
 Bad Kötzting, Germany
 Bellagio, Italy
 Bundoran, Ireland
 Granville, France
 Holstebro, Denmark
 Houffalize, Belgium
 Judenburg, Austria
 Kőszeg, Hungary
 Marsaskala, Malta
 Meerssen, Netherlands
 Niederanven, Luxembourg
 Oxelösund, Sweden
 Preveza, Greece
 Rokiškis, Lithuania
 Rovinj, Croatia
 Sesimbra, Portugal
 Sherborne, England, United Kingdom
 Sigulda, Latvia
 Siret, Romania
 Škofja Loka, Slovenia
 Sušice, Czech Republic
 Tryavna, Bulgaria
 Türi, Estonia
 Zvolen, Slovakia
Other
 Schwedt, Germany

Chojnice

 Bayeux, France
 Emsdetten, Germany
 Korsun-Shevchenkivskyi, Ukraine
 Mazyr, Belarus

Chojnów

 Commentry, France
 Egelsbach, Germany
 Mnichovo Hradiště, Czech Republic

Chorzów

 Creil, France
 Iserlohn, Germany
 Ózd, Hungary
 Termoli, Italy
 Ternopil, Ukraine
 Zlín, Czech Republic

Choszczno

 Fürstenwalde, Germany
 Ovruch, Ukraine

Chrzanów

 Harnes, France
 Nyékládháza, Hungary
 Ivano-Frankivsk, Ukraine

Ciechanów

 Bielawa, Poland
 Brezno, Slovakia
 Haldensleben, Germany
 Khmelnytskyi, Ukraine
 Meudon, France

Cieszyn

 Balchik, Bulgaria
 Cambrai, France
 Český Těšín, Czech Republic
 Genk, Belgium
 Puck, Poland
 Rožňava, Slovakia
 Teuva, Finland

Czechowice-Dziedzice

 Hiddenhausen, Germany
 Łomża, Poland
 Orlová, Czech Republic
 Rajec, Slovakia
 Slonim, Belarus

Czeladź

 Auby, France
 Jēkabpils, Latvia
 Várpalota, Hungary
 Zhydachiv, Ukraine

Czersk
 Boizenburg, Germany

Czerwionka-Leszczyny

 Cacica, Romania
 Dubno, Ukraine
 Jēkabpils, Latvia
 Sokołów Podlaski, Poland

Częstochowa

 Bethlehem, Palestine
 Kamianets-Podilskyi, Ukraine 
 Loreto, Italy
 Lourdes, France
 Nazareth, Israel
 Ourém, Portugal
 Pforzheim, Germany
 Rēzekne, Latvia

 South Bend, United States
 Styria, Austria
 Zapopan, Mexico

Człuchów

 Conches-en-Ouche, France

 Kaniv, Ukraine 
 Uslar, Germany

D
Dąbrowa Górnicza

 Alchevsk, Ukraine 
 Câmpulung Moldovenesc, Romania
 Mediaș, Romania
 Studénka, Czech Republic

Darłowo

 Gardelegen, Germany
 Hässleholm, Sweden
 Nexø (Bornholm), Denmark
 Saint-Doulchard, France
 Starý Hrozenkov, Czech Republic
 Zingst, Germany

Dębica

 Kapuvár, Hungary
 Muro, Spain
 Puurs-Sint-Amands, Belgium
 Svishtov, Bulgaria

Dębica (rural gmina)

 Ciceu, Romania
 Hanušovce nad Topľou, Slovakia
 Härjedalen, Sweden
 Kapuvár, Hungary
 Morshyn, Ukraine
 Rudky, Ukraine
 Újszász, Hungary

Dębno

 Grodzisk Wielkopolski, Poland
 Nowy Tomyśl, Poland
 Postomino, Poland
 Renkum, Netherlands
 Strausberg, Germany
 Tczew, Poland
 Terezín, Czech Republic

Długołęka

 Fossano, Italy
 Sarny, Ukraine
 Velen, Germany

Dobre Miasto

 Kostopil, Ukraine
 Montierchaume, France
 Nieporęt, Poland
 Quakenbrück, Germany

Dopiewo

 Dallgow-Döberitz, Germany
 Maen Roch, France
 Schalkau, Germany
 Vilnius District Municipality, Lithuania

Drezdenko
 Winsen, Germany

Dzierżoniów

 Bischofsheim, Germany
 Crewe, England, United Kingdom
 Hajdúszoboszló, Hungary
 Kluczbork, Poland
 Lanškroun, Czech Republic
 Nantwich, England, United Kingdom

E
Elbląg

 Baoji, China
 Compiègne, France
 Coquimbo, Chile
 Druskininkai, Lithuania
 Laibin, China
 Leer, Germany
 Liepāja, Latvia
 Narva, Estonia
 Nowy Sącz, Poland
 Ronneby, Sweden
 Tainan, Taiwan
 Ternopil, Ukraine
 Trowbridge, England, United Kingdom

Ełk

 Alytus, Lithuania
 Nettetal, Germany

G

Gd–Gn
Gdańsk

 Astana, Kazakhstan
 Bremen, Germany
 Cleveland, United States
 Kalmar, Sweden
 Nice, France
 Rotterdam, Netherlands
 Sefton, England, United Kingdom
 Turku, Finland
 Vilnius, Lithuania

Gdynia

 Aalborg, Denmark
 Brooklyn (New York), United States
 Côte d'Opale (communauté), France
 Haikou, China
 Karlskrona, Sweden
 Kiel, Germany
 Klaipėda, Lithuania
 Kotka, Finland
 Kristiansand, Norway
 Kunda (Viru-Nigula), Estonia
 Liepāja, Latvia
 Plymouth, England, United Kingdom
 Seattle, United States

Giżycko

 Dubno, Ukraine
 Grodzisk Mazowiecki, Poland

 Querfurt, Germany
 Trakai, Lithuania
 Varėna, Lithuania

Gliwice

 Bottrop, Germany
 Dessau-Roßlau, Germany
 Doncaster, England, United Kingdom
 Kežmarok, Slovakia
 Nacka, Sweden
 Salgótarján, Hungary
 Valenciennes, France

Głogów

 Amber Valley, England, United Kingdom
 Eisenhüttenstadt, Germany
 Kamianets-Podilskyi, Ukraine
 Laholm, Sweden
 Langenhagen, Germany

 Riesa, Germany

Głogów Małopolski

 Ibrány, Hungary
 Lysá nad Labem, Czech Republic
 Nemenčinė, Lithuania
 Perechyn, Ukraine
 Spišské Podhradie, Slovakia

Głogówek

 Rietberg, Germany
 Vrbno pod Pradědem, Czech Republic

Głubczyce

 Krnov, Czech Republic
 Město Albrechtice, Czech Republic
 Rockenhausen, Germany
 Rusín, Czech Republic
 Saint-Rémy-sur-Avre, France
 Zbarazh, Ukraine

Głuchołazy

 Jeseník, Czech Republic
 Mikulovice, Czech Republic
 Zlaté Hory, Czech Republic

Gniezno

 Anagni, Italy
 Esztergom, Hungary
 Falkenberg, Sweden
 Radviliškis, Lithuania
 Saint-Malo, France
 Speyer, Germany
 Uman, Ukraine
 Veendam, Netherlands

Go
Godów

 Dolní Lutyně, Czech Republic
 Petrovice u Karviné, Czech Republic
 Stare Miasto, Poland

Gogolin

 Jablunkov, Czech Republic
 Kysucké Nové Mesto, Slovakia
 Łodygowice, Poland
 Schongau, Germany
 Zwierzyniec, Poland

Gołdap

 Ano Syros, Greece
 Giv'at Shmuel, Israel

 Šakiai, Lithuania
 Stade, Germany

Goleniów

 Bergen auf Rügen, Germany
 Greifswald, Germany
 Mölln, Germany
 Pyrzyce, Poland
 Svedala, Sweden

Goleszów

 Bystřice, Czech Republic
 Reiskirchen, Germany
 Vendryně, Czech Republic

Góra
 Herzberg am Harz, Germany

Góra Kalwaria
 Vorzel, Ukraine

Gorlice

 Bardejov, Slovakia
 Kalush, Ukraine

 Pápa, Hungary

Gorzów Wielkopolski

 Cava de' Tirreni, Italy
 Eberswalde, Germany
 Frankfurt an der Oder, Germany
 Herford (district), Germany

 Sumy, Ukraine
 Teramo, Italy

Gorzyce

 Bohumín, Czech Republic
 Dolní Lutyně, Czech Republic
 Kamianets-Podilskyi, Ukraine
 Stará Bystrica, Slovakia

Gostyń
 Ķekava, Latvia

Gostynin
 Langenfeld, Germany

Gr–Gu
Grodków

 Beckum, Germany
 Borshchiv, Ukraine

Grodzisk Mazowiecki

 Carros, France
 Danilovgrad, Montenegro
 Giżycko, Poland
 Radviliškis, Lithuania

 Weiz, Austria

Grodzisk Wielkopolski

 Biržai, Lithuania
 Brod, Bosnia and Herzegovina
 Dębno, Poland
 Delligsen, Germany
 Dolyna, Ukraine
 Merksplas, Belgium

Grójec

 Horki, Belarus
 Spišská Nová Ves, Slovakia
 Strumica, North Macedonia

Grudziądz

 Falun, Sweden
 Gütersloh, Germany
 Nanning, China

Grybów (rural gmina)
 Château-Thierry, France

Gryfice

 Gryfów Śląski, Poland
 Güstrow, Germany
 Meldorf, Germany

Gryfino

 Barlinek, Poland
 Schwedt, Germany

Gubin

 Guben, Germany
 Kwidzyn, Poland
 Laatzen, Germany

H
Hajnówka

 Jurbarkas, Lithuania
 Kamyenyets, Belarus
 Krāslava, Latvia
 Põhja-Sakala, Estonia
 Pruzhany, Belarus

 Svislach, Belarus

Hrubieszów

 Bijelo Polje, Montenegro
 Svishtov, Bulgaria
 Sokal, Ukraine
 Volodymyr, Ukraine

I
Iława

 Herborn, Germany
 Klaipėda District Municipality, Lithuania
 Kose, Estonia
 Tholen, Netherlands

Inowrocław
 Bad Oeynhausen, Germany

Izabelin

 Borken, Germany
 Dolni Chiflik, Bulgaria
 Méru, France
 Mickūnai, Lithuania

J
Jabłonka

 Brebu, Romania
 Hořice, Czech Republic
 Nagymányok, Hungary
 Reichelsheim, Germany
 Trstená, Slovakia
 Wolbórz, Poland

Jarocin

 Hatvan, Hungary
 Libercourt, France
 Oleksandriia, Ukraine
 Opoczno, Poland
 Schlüchtern, Germany
 Slonim, Belarus
 Veldhoven, Netherlands

Jarosław

 Dingelstädt, Germany
 Humenné, Slovakia
 Kőbánya (Budapest), Hungary
 Michalovce, Slovakia
 Orange, France
 Svidník, Slovakia
 Uzhhorod, Ukraine
 Vyškov, Czech Republic
 Yavoriv, Ukraine

Jasienica
 Petřvald, Czech Republic

Jasło

 Bardejov, Slovakia
 Camposampiero, Italy
 Hodonín, Czech Republic
 Makó, Hungary
 Prague 10 (Prague), Czech Republic
 Sambir, Ukraine
 Trebišov, Slovakia
 Truskavets, Ukraine

Jastrzębie-Zdrój

 Borshchiv, Ukraine
 Havířov, Czech Republic
 Ibbenbüren, Germany
 Karviná, Czech Republic
 Prievidza, Slovakia
 Tourcoing, France

Jawor

 Berdychiv, Ukraine
 Niepołomice, Poland
 Niesky, Germany
 Roseto degli Abruzzi, Italy
 Turnov, Czech Republic

Jaworzno

 Hereford, England, United Kingdom
 Karviná, Czech Republic
 Szigethalom, Hungary
 Yiwu, China

Jędrzejów

 Keszthely, Hungary
 Reichenbach im Vogtland, Germany

Jelcz-Laskowice

 Gudensberg, Germany
 Rtyně v Podkrkonoší, Czech Republic
 Shchyrets, Ukraine

Jelenia Góra

 Bautzen, Germany
 Boxberg, Germany
 Cervia, Italy
 Changzhou, China
 Erftstadt, Germany

 Jablonec nad Nisou, Czech Republic
 Randers, Denmark
 Sievierodonetsk, Ukraine
 Tequila, Mexico
 Tyler, United States
 Valkeakoski, Finland

K

Ka–Kn
Kalisz

 Erfurt, Germany 
 Hamm, Germany
 Hautmont, France
 Heerhugowaard, Netherlands
 Kamianets-Podilskyi, Ukraine
 La Louvière, Belgium
 Martin, Slovakia
 Preston, England, United Kingdom

Kalwaria Zebrzydowska

 Bisceglie, Italy
 Hamelin, Germany
 Levoča, Slovakia
 Moravské Budějovice, Czech Republic

Kamień Pomorski

 Bromölla, Sweden
 Kowary, Poland
 Lünen, Germany
 Porvoo, Finland
 Torgelow, Germany

Kamienna Góra

 Bitterfeld-Wolfen, Germany
 Dvůr Králové nad Labem, Czech Republic
 Ikast-Brande, Denmark
 Shchyrets, Ukraine
 Trutnov, Czech Republic
 Vierzon, France
 Wolfenbüttel, Germany

Kartuzy

 Caissargues, France
 Duderstadt, Germany
 Gori, Georgia
 Kaili, China

Katowice

 Cologne, Germany
 Donetsk, Ukraine
 Groningen, Netherlands
 Košice, Slovakia

 Miskolc, Hungary
 Mobile, United States
 Odense, Denmark
 Opava, Czech Republic
 Ostrava, Czech Republic
 Pula, Croatia
 Saint-Étienne, France
 Shenyang, China
 South Dublin, Ireland

Kąty Wrocławskie

 Biblis, Germany
 Mignaloux-Beauvoir, France
 Svitlovodsk Raion, Ukraine
 Żerków, Poland

Kędzierzyn-Koźle

 Jonava, Lithuania
 Kalush, Ukraine
 Öhringen, Germany
 Pisz, Poland
 Přerov, Czech Republic
 Racibórz, Poland

Kępno

 Encs, Hungary
 Giano dell'Umbria, Italy
 Trutnov, Czech Republic

Kętrzyn

 Volodymyr, Ukraine
 Wesel, Germany
 Zlaté Hory, Czech Republic

Kętrzyn (rural gmina)

 Gulbene, Latvia
 Mauron, France

 Prienai, Lithuania
 Rietavas, Lithuania

Kęty

 Courcelles, Belgium
 Keť, Slovakia
 Kéty, Hungary
 Rajec, Slovakia
 Turzovka, Slovakia

Kielce

 Csepel (Budapest), Hungary
 Gotha, Germany
 Orange, France
 Ramla, Israel
 Vinnytsia, Ukraine

Kłobuck
 Štúrovo, Slovakia

Kłodzko

 Bensheim, Germany
 Carvin, France
 Fléron, Belgium
 Limanowa, Poland
 Náchod, Czech Republic
 Rădăuți, Romania
 Rychnov nad Kněžnou, Czech Republic

Kłodzko (rural gmina)

 Georgsmarienhütte, Germany
 Rytro, Poland
 Zbąszyń, Poland

Kluczbork

 Bad Dürkheim, Germany
 Berezhany, Ukraine
 Dzierżoniów, Poland

Knurów

 Kazincbarcika, Hungary
 Svit, Slovakia

Ko
Kobylnica

 Bátonyterenye, Hungary
 Jirkov, Czech Republic
 Kościelisko, Poland
 Malá Morávka, Czech Republic
 Marneuli, Georgia
 Nižná Sitnica, Slovakia
 Przemęt, Poland
 Tvrdošín, Slovakia
 Valga, Estonia
 Valka, Latvia
 Víťaz, Slovakia
 Walce, Poland
 Zarszyn, Poland

Kolbuszowa

 Apensen, Germany
 Cassino, Italy
 Cobh, Ireland
 Mátészalka, Hungary
 Ploërmel, France
 Staryi Sambir, Ukraine

Kołobrzeg

 Bad Oldesloe, Germany
 Barth, Germany
 Feodosia, Ukraine
 Follonica, Italy
 Koekelberg, Belgium

 Nyborg, Denmark
 Opatija, Croatia
 Pankow (Berlin), Germany
 Pori, Finland
 Simrishamn, Sweden

Komorniki

 Kamienica, Poland
 Smižany, Slovakia
 Vilnius District Municipality, Lithuania

Konin

 Akmenė, Lithuania

 Chernivtsi, Ukraine
 Deyang, China
 Dobele, Latvia
 Hénin-Beaumont, France
 Herne, Germany
 Joniškis, Lithuania
 Karlovo, Bulgaria

 Santa Susanna, Spain
 Sundsvall, Sweden
 Ungheni, Moldova
 Valašské Meziříčí, Czech Republic
 Wakefield, England, United Kingdom

Końskie

 Mohyliv-Podilskyi, Ukraine
 Oroszlány, Hungary
 Šaľa, Slovakia

Konstancin-Jeziorna

 Cēsis, Latvia
 Denzlingen, Germany
 Hranice, Czech Republic
 Kremenets, Ukraine
 Leidschendam-Voorburg, Netherlands
 Naujoji Vilnia (Vilnius), Lithuania
 Pisogne, Italy
 Saint-Germain-en-Laye, France

Kórnik

 Königstein im Taunus, Germany
 Uman, Ukraine

Koronowo

 Senden, Germany
 Spinetoli, Italy
 Vilnius District Municipality, Lithuania

Kościan

 Alzey, Germany
 Krimpen aan den IJssel, Netherlands
 Rakovník, Czech Republic
 Schmalkalden, Germany

Kościelisko

 Durbuy, Belgium
 Kobylnica, Poland
 Orimattila, Finland
 Östhammar, Sweden
 Tvrdošín, Slovakia
 Valga, Estonia
 Valka, Latvia

Kostrzyn nad Odrą

 Peitz, Germany
 Sambir, Ukraine
 Seelow, Germany

Koszalin

 Albano Laziale, Italy
 Bourges, France
 Fuzhou, China
 Gladsaxe, Denmark
 Ivano-Frankivsk, Ukraine
 Neubrandenburg, Germany
 Neumünster, Germany
 Schwedt, Germany
 Seinäjoki, Finland
 Tempelhof-Schöneberg (Berlin), Germany
 Trakai, Lithuania

Kowary

 Černý Důl, Czech Republic
 Frederikssund, Denmark
 Kamień Pomorski, Poland
 Malá Úpa, Czech Republic
 Schönau-Berzdorf, Germany
 Vrchlabí, Czech Republic
 Žacléř, Czech Republic

Koziegłowy
 Vatra Dornei, Romania

Kozienice

 Chuhuiv, Ukraine
 Göllheim, Germany
 Lanuvio, Italy
 Medzilaborce, Slovakia

Kożuchów
 Schwepnitz, Germany

Kr–Kw
Kraków

 Bordeaux, France
 Bratislava, Slovakia
 Budapest, Hungary
 Curitiba, Brazil
 Cusco, Peru
 Edinburgh, Scotland, United Kingdom
 Fez, Morocco

 Frankfurt am Main, Germany
 Gothenburg, Sweden
 Innsbruck, Austria
 Kyiv, Ukraine
 Leipzig, Germany
 Leuven, Belgium
 Lviv, Ukraine
 Milan, Italy
 Nuremberg, Germany
 Olomouc, Czech Republic 
 Orléans, France
 Pécs, Hungary
 Quito, Ecuador
 Rochester, United States

 San Francisco, United States

 La Serena, Chile
 Solothurn, Switzerland
 Tbilisi, Georgia
 Vilnius, Lithuania

Krapkowice

 Camas, United States
 Ebersbach-Neugersdorf, Germany
 Hillsboro, United States
 Lipová-lázně, Czech Republic
 Morawica, Poland
 Partizánske, Slovakia
 Rohatyn, Ukraine
 Wissen, Germany
 Zabierzów, Poland

Kraśnik

 Hajdúböszörmény, Hungary
 Korosten, Ukraine

 Ruiselede, Belgium
 Šilalė, Lithuania
 Trogir, Croatia

Krasnystaw

 Alvesta, Sweden
 Horokhiv, Ukraine
 Püspökladány, Hungary
 Turiisk, Ukraine
 Žatec, Czech Republic

Krosno

 Edewecht, Germany
 Gualdo Tadino, Italy
 Košice, Slovakia
 Marl, Germany
 Øygarden, Norway
 Sárospatak, Hungary
 Sátoraljaújhely, Hungary
 Uherské Hradiště, Czech Republic
 Uzhhorod, Ukraine
 Zalaegerszeg, Hungary

Krosno Odrzańskie

 Bremervörde, Germany
 Karcag, Hungary
 Schwarzheide, Germany

Krotoszyn

 Brummen, Netherlands
 Bucak, Turkey
 Dierdorf, Germany
 Fontenay-le-Comte, France
 Fonyód, Hungary
 Okinoshima, Japan
 Vilnius District Municipality, Lithuania

Krynica-Zdrój

 Amersham, England, United Kingdom
 Bad Sooden-Allendorf, Germany
 Bardejov, Slovakia
 Khmilnyk, Ukraine

Krzeszowice

 Chaumes-en-Brie, France
 Kispest (Budapest), Hungary

Kudowa-Zdrój

 Horn-Bad Meinberg, Germany
 Hronov, Czech Republic
 Náchod, Czech Republic
 Tuchola, Poland

Kutno
 Bat Yam, Israel

Kwidzyn

 Bar, Ukraine
 Celle, Germany
 Gubin, Poland
 Olofström, Sweden

L

La–Le
Łańcut

 Baktalórántháza, Hungary
 Balmazújváros, Hungary
 Levoča, Slovakia
 Tavira, Portugal
 Uman, Ukraine

Łask
 Elbtalaue, Germany

Łaziska Górne

 Fulnek, Czech Republic
 Vrútky, Slovakia

Lębork

 Balta, Ukraine
 Dudelange, Luxembourg
 Lauenburg, Germany
 Manom, France
 Sokal, Ukraine
 Vawkavysk, Belarus

Łęczna

 Hajdúhadház, Hungary
 Kovel, Ukraine
 Treviolo, Italy

Łęczyca

 Penzlin, Germany
 Rillieux-la-Pape, France
 Rypin, Poland
 Volodymyr, Ukraine

Lędziny

 Revúca, Slovakia
 Roccagorga, Italy
 Uničov, Czech Republic

Legionowo

 Borjomi, Georgia
 Carnikava, Latvia
 Jiujiang, China
 Kovel, Ukraine
 Rzhev, Russia
 Sevlievo, Bulgaria
 Vyzhnytsia, Ukraine

Legnica

 Blansko, Czech Republic
 Drohobych, Ukraine
 Meissen, Germany
 Roanne, France
 Wuppertal, Germany

Leśnica

 Černošice, Czech Republic
 Crostwitz, Germany
 Gerbrunn, Germany
 Hirschaid, Germany
 Karnes County, United States
 Voitsberg, Austria

Leszno

 Deurne, Netherlands
 Montluçon, France
 Suhl, Germany

Lesznowola
 Ialoveni, Moldova

Li–Lo
Lidzbark Warmiński

 Hoeksche Waard, Netherlands
 Milanówek, Poland
 Sovetsk, Russia
 Visaginas, Lithuania
 Werlte, Germany

Limanowa

 Dolný Kubín, Slovakia
 Kłodzko, Poland
 Mrągowo, Poland
 Nagykálló, Hungary
 Niles, United States
 Truskavets, Ukraine
 Wathlingen, Germany

Limanowa (rural gmina)
 Oravská Poruba, Slovakia

Łobez

 Affing, Germany
 Guča (Lučani), Serbia
 Kėdainiai, Lithuania
 Paikuse (Pärnu), Estonia
 Rajcza, Poland
 Svalöv, Sweden
 Wiek, Germany

Łodygowice

 Gogolin, Poland
 Kysucké Nové Mesto, Slovakia

Łódź

 Barreiro, Portugal
 Chemnitz, Germany
 Chengdu, China 
 Guangzhou, China
 Lviv, Ukraine
 Lyon, France
 Murcia, Spain
 Odesa, Ukraine
 Puebla, Mexico
 Rustavi, Georgia
 Stuttgart, Germany
 Szeged, Hungary
 Tampere, Finland
 Tel Aviv, Israel
 Tianjin, China 
 Vilnius, Lithuania

Łomianki

 Columbia Heights, United States
 Noyelles-lès-Vermelles, France

Łomża

 Czechowice-Dziedzice, Poland
 Kolomyia, Ukraine

 Muscatine, United States
 Pavlikeni, Bulgaria

 Sigtuna, Sweden
 Subotica, Serbia
 Zviahel, Ukraine

Łowicz

 Cheektowaga, United States
 Colditz, Germany
 Lubliniec, Poland
 Montoire-sur-le-Loir, France
 Reda, Poland
 Šalčininkai, Lithuania
 Saluzzo, Italy
 Shepetivka, Ukraine
 Stupava, Slovakia

Lu–Lw
Lubaczów

 Érd, Hungary
 Levice, Slovakia
 Reghin, Romania
 Sobrance, Slovakia
 Tostedt, Germany
 Yavoriv, Ukraine

Lubań

 Kamenz, Germany
 Kolín, Czech Republic
 Königsbrück, Germany
 Löbau, Germany
 Prienai, Lithuania

Lubartów

 Hajdúdorog, Hungary
 Raseiniai, Lithuania

Lubawka

 Adršpach, Czech Republic
 Žacléř, Czech Republic

Lubin
 Rhein-Lahn (district), Germany

Lubin (rural gmina)
 Sathonay-Camp, France

Lublin

 Alcalá de Henares, Spain
 Debrecen, Hungary
 Delmenhorst, Germany
 Erie, United States
 Ivano-Frankivsk, Ukraine
 Jiaozuo, China 
 Lancaster, England, United Kingdom
 Luhansk, Ukraine
 Lutsk, Ukraine
 Lviv, Ukraine
 Münster, Germany
 Nancy, France
 Nilüfer, Turkey
 Panevėžys, Lithuania
 Pernik, Bulgaria
 Rishon LeZion, Israel
 Starobilsk, Ukraine
 Rivne, Ukraine
 Sumy, Ukraine
 Tbilisi, Georgia
 Tilburg, Netherlands
 Timișoara, Romania
 Viseu, Portugal
 Windsor, Canada

Lubliniec

 Bánovce nad Bebravou, Slovakia
 Kiskunmajsa, Hungary
 Kravaře, Czech Republic
 Łowicz, Poland
 Reda, Poland
 Teruel, Spain

Lubsko

 Brody, Poland
 Forst, Germany
 Gribskov, Denmark
 Masny, France
 Pavlohrad, Ukraine
 Vlotho, Germany

Łuków

 Baranivka, Ukraine
 Lazdijai, Lithuania
 Tõrva, Estonia
 Voisins-le-Bretonneux, France

Lwówek Śląski

 Chrastava, Czech Republic
 Heidenau, Germany
 Lwówek, Poland
 Noidans-lès-Vesoul, France
 Velký Šenov, Czech Republic
 Wilthen, Germany

M
Maków

 Ludza, Latvia
 Molėtai, Lithuania
 Purgstall an der Erlauf, Austria

Maków Podhalański

 Mezőtúr, Hungary
 Władysławowo, Poland
 Zubrohlava, Slovakia

Malbork

 Kilkenny, Ireland
 Margny-lès-Compiègne, France
 Monheim am Rhein, Germany
 Nordhorn, Germany
 Offagna, Italy
 Sölvesborg, Sweden
 Trakai, Lithuania

Miastko

 Bad Fallingbostel, Germany
 Kelmė, Lithuania
 Périers, France

Miechów

 Herve, Belgium
 Volochysk, Ukraine

Miedźna

 Hustopeče, Czech Republic

 Zbarazh, Ukraine

Międzyrzecz

 Andrésy, France
 Bad Freienwalde, Germany
 Charlottenburg-Wilmersdorf (Berlin), Germany
 Haren, Germany
 Westerwolde, Netherlands

Międzyzdroje

 Bakhchysarai Raion, Ukraine

 Izola, Slovenia
 Lomma, Sweden
 Sellin, Germany

Miękinia

 Oria, Italy
 Schwarmstedt, Germany

Mielec

 Douchy-les-Mines, France
 Löhne, Germany

 Mukachevo, Ukraine
 Saint-Martin-des-Champs, France
 Saint-Thégonnec Loc-Eguiner, France
 Tiszaföldvár, Hungary
 Vila Nova de Poiares, Portugal

Mikołów

 Beuningen, Netherlands
 Ilava, Slovakia
 Klimkovice, Czech Republic
 Sainte-Geneviève-des-Bois, France

Milanówek

 Fumone, Italy
 Lidzbark Warmiński, Poland
 Welzheim, Germany

Milicz

 Kobuleti, Georgia
 Lohr am Main, Germany

Milówka

 Kóny, Hungary
 Markaz, Hungary
 Milíkov, Czech Republic
 Topoľníky, Slovakia
 Valentigney, France

Mińsk Mazowiecki

 Borodianka, Ukraine
 Krnov, Czech Republic
 Lacey, United States
 Pefki, Greece
 Saint-Égrève, France
 Telšiai, Lithuania

Mirsk

 Dubá, Czech Republic
 Lázně Libverda, Czech Republic
 Nové Město pod Smrkem, Czech Republic

Mława

 Barañáin, Spain
 Bartoszyce, Poland
 Kriva Palanka, North Macedonia
 Moscufo, Italy
 Năsăud, Romania
 Raseiniai, Lithuania

 Viernheim, Germany

Mogilno

 Brody, Ukraine
 Engelskirchen, Germany

Morawica

 Balanivka, Ukraine
 Camas, United States
 Herbolzheim, Germany
 Hillsboro, United States
 Krapkowice, Poland
 Priverno, Italy
 Rača (Bratislava), Slovakia
 Zabierzów, Poland

Mosina
 Seelze, Germany

Mrągowo

 Condom, France
 Grünberg, Germany
 Limanowa, Poland

Murowana Goślina

 Hemmingen, Germany
 Ochotnica Dolna, Poland
 Yvetot, France

Myślenice

 Bełchatów, Poland
 Csopak, Hungary
 Lüdenscheid, Germany
 Spišská Nová Ves, Slovakia
 Tinqueux, France

Myślibórz

 Kaunas, Lithuania
 Neuhardenberg, Germany
 Soltau, Germany

Mysłowice

 Enz (district), Germany
 Frýdek-Místek, Czech Republic

Myszków

 Los Alcázares, Spain
 Békés, Hungary
 Kopřivnice, Czech Republic
 Námestovo, Slovakia
 Zwönitz, Germany

N
Nakło nad Notecią

 Elsterwerda, Germany
 Náklo, Czech Republic
 Naklo, Slovenia
 Seymour, United States

Namysłów

 Hlučín, Czech Republic
 Kisköre, Hungary

 Nebelschütz, Germany
 Yaremche, Ukraine
 Zagon, Romania

Niemodlin

 Dolyna, Ukraine
 Pražmo, Czech Republic
 Štíty, Czech Republic
 Vechelde, Germany

Niepołomice

 Jawor, Poland
 Kuřim, Czech Republic
 Monselice, Italy
 Paliano, Italy
 Saint-Jean-de-la-Ruelle, France
 Szécsény, Hungary

Nieporęt

 Dobre Miasto, Poland
 Dolna Banya, Bulgaria
 Drahanská vrchovina (microregion), Czech Republic
 Strážske, Slovakia

Nisko

 Fehérgyarmat, Hungary
 Hecklingen, Germany
 Horodok, Ukraine
 Semerovo, Slovakia

Nowa Ruda

 Broumov, Czech Republic
 Castrop-Rauxel, Germany
 Wallers, France

Nowa Sarzyna

 Dolyna, Ukraine
 Olaine, Latvia

Nowa Sól

 Achim, Germany
 Fresagrandinaria, Italy
 Püttlingen, Germany
 Saint-Michel-sur-Orge, France
 Senftenberg, Germany
 Veszprém, Hungary
 Žamberk, Czech Republic

Nowogard

 Baltiysk, Russia
 Dubrovytsia, Ukraine
 Gornji Milanovac, Serbia
 Gützkow, Germany
 Heide, Germany
 Kävlinge, Sweden

 Veles, North Macedonia

Nowogród Bobrzański

 Cimișlia, Moldova
 Lübbenau, Germany
 Westerwolde, Netherlands

Nowogrodziec

 Großdubrau, Germany
 Peremyshliany Raion, Ukraine 
 Srbac, Bosnia and Herzegovina

Nowy Dwór Gdański

 Hennef, Germany
 Sarny, Ukraine
 Velká nad Veličkou, Czech Republic

Nowy Dwór Mazowiecki

 Elektrėnai, Lithuania
 Niederorschel, Germany

Nowy Sącz

 Columbia County, United States
 Elbląg, Poland
 Gabrovo, Bulgaria
 Kiskunhalas, Hungary
 Narvik, Norway
 Netanya, Israel
 Prešov, Slovakia

 Stará Ľubovňa, Slovakia
 Stryi, Ukraine
 Suzhou, China
 Tarnów, Poland
 Trakai, Lithuania

Nowy Targ

 Évry-Courcouronnes, France
 Kežmarok, Slovakia
 Radevormwald, Germany
 Roverbella, Italy

Nowy Tomyśl

 Biesenthal, Germany
 Dębno, Poland
 Goch, Germany
 Sulęcin, Poland

Nowy Żmigród

 Putnok, Hungary
 Tisovec, Slovakia

Nysa

 Batumi, Georgia
 Ingelheim am Rhein, Germany
 Jeseník, Czech Republic
 Kolomyia, Ukraine
 Lüdinghausen, Germany
 Šumperk, Czech Republic
 Taverny, France
 Ternopil, Ukraine

O

Ob–Op
Oborniki

 Herk-de-Stad, Belgium
 Kobuleti, Georgia
 Lüchow, Germany
 Novoiavorivsk, Ukraine

Odolanów

 Heringen/Helme, Germany
 Heringen (Werra), Germany
 Martvili, Georgia
 La Mézière, France
 Nyasvizh, Belarus
 Saulkrasti, Latvia

Ogrodzieniec

 Bogács, Hungary
 Forbach, Germany
 Groß-Bieberau, Germany
 Melissano, Italy
 Spišské Podhradie, Slovakia
 Tuczno, Poland

Oława

 Česká Třebová, Czech Republic
 Oberasbach, Germany
 Priolo Gargallo, Italy
 Sighetu Marmației, Romania
 Zolochiv, Ukraine

Oława (rural gmina)

 Pidhaitsi Raion, Ukraine
 Rudamina, Lithuania

Oleśnica

 Chrudim, Czech Republic
 Jaunay-Marigny, France
 Warendorf, Germany

Olesno

 Arnsberg, Germany
 Zalakaros, Hungary

Olkusz

 Bergamo, Italy
 Bjerringbro (Viborg), Denmark
 Bruay-la-Buissière, France
 Pontenure, Italy
 Schwalbach am Taunus, Germany
 Staffordshire Moorlands, England, United Kingdom

Olsztyn

 Châteauroux, France
 Gelsenkirchen, Germany

 Lutsk, Ukraine
 Offenburg, Germany

 Rovaniemi, Finland
 Weifang, China

Olsztynek

 Banská Štiavnica, Slovakia
 Déols, France
 Felsőzsolca, Hungary
 Łapsze Niżne, Poland
 Luant, France
 Le Poinçonnet, France
 Strängnäs, Sweden
 Vilnius District Municipality, Lithuania
 Walkenried, Germany

Opoczno

 Bytča, Slovakia
 Jarocin, Poland
 Opočno, Czech Republic

Opole

 Alytus, Lithuania
 Bruntál, Czech Republic
 Carrara, Italy
 Grasse, France
 Ingolstadt, Germany
 Ivano-Frankivsk, Ukraine
 Kuopio, Finland
 Mülheim an der Ruhr, Germany
 Potsdam, Germany
 Roanoke, United States
 Székesfehérvár, Hungary

Os–Oz
Ostróda

 Ocho Rios, Jamaica
 Osterode am Harz, Germany
 Šilutė, Lithuania

Ostróda (rural gmina)

 Korets Raion, Ukraine
 Šilutė, Lithuania

Ostrołęka

 Alytus, Lithuania
 Balassagyarmat, Hungary
 Lagodekhi, Georgia
 Meppen, Germany
 Masty, Belarus
 Pryluky, Ukraine

Ostrów Mazowiecka

 Brembate di Sopra, Italy
 Iziaslav, Ukraine

Ostrów Mazowiecka (rural gmina)
 Põhja-Pärnumaa, Estonia

Ostrów Wielkopolski

 Bergerac, France
 Brantford, Canada
 Delitzsch, Germany
 Lecce, Italy
 Nordhausen, Germany

Ostrowiec Świętokrzyski

 Bekabad, Uzbekistan
 Bila Tserkva, Ukraine
 Gennevilliers, France
 Novopolotsk, Belarus
 Pineto, Italy
 Scunthorpe, England, United Kingdom

Ostrzeszów
 Stuhr, Germany

Oświęcim

 Arezzo, Italy
 Ballan-Miré, France
 Breisach, Germany
 Cori, Italy
 Kerpen, Germany
 Sambir, Ukraine

Otmuchów

 Bernkastel-Kues, Germany
 La Bourboule, France
 Javorník, Czech Republic
 Lopatyn, Ukraine
 Milo, Italy
 Varsány, Hungary

Otwock

 Lennestadt, Germany
 Saint-Amand-Montrond, France

Ożarów

 Krościenko nad Dunajcem, Poland
 Spišská Belá, Slovakia

Ozimek

 Heinsberg, Germany
 Krompachy, Slovakia
 Přerov, Czech Republic
 Rýmařov, Czech Republic

Ozorków

 Trstená, Slovakia
 Vysoké Mýto, Czech Republic

P

Pa–Pi
Pabianice

 Gusev, Russia
 Kerepes, Hungary
 Plauen, Germany
 Rokiškis, Lithuania

Parczew

 Bressuire, France
 Liuboml, Ukraine
 Prienai, Lithuania

Pasłęk
 Itzehoe, Germany

Pawłowice

 Perkupa, Hungary
 Teplička nad Váhom, Slovakia
 Verquin, France

Piaseczno

 Chitignano, Italy
 Harku, Estonia
 Huanggang, China

Piekary Śląskie

 Kobuleti, Georgia
 Kroměříž, Czech Republic
 Marija Bistrica, Croatia

Piła

 Châtellerault, France

 Imola, Italy
 Schwerin, Germany

Piława Górna

 Airaines, France
 Dobruška, Czech Republic
 Kriftel, Germany
 Pohoří, Czech Republic

Pińczów

 Bystřice, Czech Republic
 Svodín, Slovakia
 Tata, Hungary

Piotrków Trybunalski

 Esslingen am Neckar, Germany
 Marijampolė, Lithuania
 Mosonmagyaróvár, Hungary
 Ness Ziona, Israel
 Petrinja, Croatia
 Rivne, Ukraine
 Vienne, France
 Žagubica, Serbia

Piwniczna-Zdrój

 Keszthely, Hungary
 Mníšek nad Popradom, Slovakia

Pl–Po
Pleszew

 Kemer, Turkey
 Morlanwelz, Belgium
 Saint-Pierre-d'Oléron, France
 Spangenberg, Germany
 Westerstede, Germany

Płock

 Auxerre, France
 Bălți, Moldova
 Darmstadt, Germany
 Forlì, Italy
 Fort Wayne, United States
 Huai'an, China
 Loznica, Serbia
 Mažeikiai, Lithuania
 Pleven, Bulgaria
 Rustavi, Georgia
 Thurrock, England, United Kingdom
 Zhytomyr, Ukraine

Płońsk

 Antoing, Belgium
 Bakhchysarai, Ukraine
 Čakovec, Croatia
 Crépy-en-Valois, France
 Mosciano Sant'Angelo, Italy
 Notaresco, Italy
 Ramat HaNegev, Israel
 Šalčininkai, Lithuania
 Ternopil, Ukraine
 Tiszafüred, Hungary

Pniewy

 Halluin, France
 Lübbenau, Germany
 Oer-Erkenschwick, Germany

Pobiedziska

 Haaren, Netherlands

 Marktheidenfeld, Germany
 Montfort-sur-Meu, France
 Växjö, Sweden

Podgórzyn

 Desná, Czech Republic
 Górzyca, Poland
 Schirgiswalde-Kirschau, Germany
 Smołdzino, Poland
 Špindlerův Mlýn, Czech Republic

Police

 Novyi Rozdil, Ukraine
 Pasewalk, Germany
 Slagelse, Denmark

Polkowice
 Sickte, Germany

Poniatowa

 Groß-Siegharts, Austria
 Steglitz-Zehlendorf (Berlin), Germany

Poraj

 Belá-Dulice, Slovakia
 Pohořelice, Czech Republic
 Vilnius District Municipality, Lithuania

Poznań

 Assen, Netherlands

 Brno, Czech Republic
 Győr, Hungary
 Hanover, Germany
 Jyväskylä, Finland
 Kharkiv, Ukraine
 Kutaisi, Georgia
 Nablus, Palestine
 Nottinghamshire, England, United Kingdom
 Pozuelo de Alarcón, Spain
 Ra'anana, Israel
 Rennes, France
 Shenzhen, China
 Toledo, United States

Pr–Py
Prudnik

 Bohumín, Czech Republic
 Krnov, Czech Republic
 Nadvirna, Ukraine
 Northeim, Germany
 San Giustino, Italy

Pruszcz Gdański

 Hofheim am Taunus, Germany
 Šilutė, Lithuania

Przemyśl

 Drohobych, Ukraine
 Eger, Hungary
 Humenné, Slovakia
 Kamyanets-Podilskyi, Ukraine
 Lviv, Ukraine
 Mostyska, Ukraine
 Paderborn, Germany
 South Kesteven, England, United Kingdom
 Truskavets, Ukraine

Przeworsk

 Berehove, Ukraine
 Mělník, Czech Republic
 Moravský Krumlov, Czech Republic

Pszczyna

 Bergisch Gladbach, Germany
 Holešov, Czech Republic
 Kaštela, Croatia
 Klein Rönnau, Germany

Pszów
 Horní Benešov, Czech Republic

Puławy

 Boyarka, Ukraine
 Castelo Branco, Portugal

 Dubliany, Ukraine
 Nyasvizh, Belarus
 Stendal, Germany

Pułtusk

 Ganderkesee, Germany
 Montmorency, France
 New Britain, United States
 Senica, Slovakia
 Szerencs, Hungary

Pyrzyce

 Bad Sülze, Germany
 Goleniów, Poland
 Hörby, Sweden
 Korbach, Germany
 Vysoké Mýto, Czech Republic
 Złocieniec, Poland

Pyskowice

 Chervonohrad, Ukraine
 Flörsheim am Main, Germany
 La Ricamarie, France

R
Rabka-Zdrój

 Château-Gontier, France
 Frome, England, United Kingdom
 Kiskunfélegyháza, Hungary
 Murrhardt, Germany

Racibórz

 Kędzierzyn-Koźle, Poland
 Leverkusen, Germany
 Opava, Czech Republic
 Roth, Germany
 Tysmenytsia, Ukraine
 Villeneuve-d'Ascq, France
 Zugló (Budapest), Hungary

Radlin

 Genthin, Germany
 Mohelnice, Czech Republic
 Rohatyn, Ukraine

Radom

 Banská Bystrica, Slovakia
 Daugavpils, Latvia
 Huzhou, China
 Magdeburg, Germany
 Ploiești, Romania
 Stara Zagora, Bulgaria
 Taoyuan, Taiwan
 Vilnius District Municipality, Lithuania

Radomsko

 Kiryat Bialik, Israel
 Lincoln, England, United Kingdom
 Makó, Hungary
 Olaine, Latvia
 Voznesensk, Ukraine

Rawa Mazowiecka

 Boskovice, Czech Republic
 Nyírbátor, Hungary

Rawicz

 Attendorn, Germany
 Hlybokaye, Belarus

Reda

 Łowicz, Poland
 Lubliniec, Poland
 Vilnius District Municipality, Lithuania
 Waldbronn, Germany

Reszel

 Jašiūnai (Šalčininkai), Lithuania
 Jemnice, Czech Republic
 Legden, Germany
 Raabs an der Thaya, Austria

Rogoźno

 Marijampolė, Lithuania
 La Trimouille, France
 Tulchyn, Ukraine

 Wustrow, Germany

Ropczyce

 Ochsenfurt, Germany
 Stropkov, Slovakia

Ruda Śląska

 Carrickfergus, Northern Ireland, United Kingdom
 Levice, Slovakia
 Mank, Austria
 Vibo Valentia, Italy

Rumia

 Dęblin, Poland
 Hultsfred, Sweden
 Švenčionys, Lithuania

Rybnik

 Antrim and Newtownabbey, Northern Ireland, United Kingdom
 Bar, Ukraine
 Dorsten, Germany
 Eurasburg, Germany
 Ivano-Frankivsk, Ukraine
 Karviná, Czech Republic
 Labin, Croatia
 Larissa, Greece
 Liévin, France
 Mazamet, France
 Saint-Vallier, France
 Topoľčany, Slovakia
 Vilnius District Municipality, Lithuania

Rydułtowy

 Hvidovre, Denmark
 Orlová, Czech Republic
 Reken, Germany

Rypin

 Bauska, Latvia

 Łęczyca, Poland
 Pakruojis, Lithuania

Rzeszów

 Bielefeld, Germany
 Buffalo, United States
 Chernihiv, Ukraine
 Fangchenggang, China
 Gainesville, United States
 Ivano-Frankivsk, Ukraine
 Klagenfurt, Austria
 Košice, Slovakia
 Lamia, Greece
 Lutsk, Ukraine
 Lviv, Ukraine
 Nyíregyháza, Hungary
 Rushmoor, England, United Kingdom
 Satu Mare, Romania
 Split, Croatia
 Truskavets, Ukraine

S

Sa–Sk
Sandomierz

 Emmendingen, Germany
 Newark-on-Trent, England, United Kingdom
 Ostroh, Ukraine
 Volterra, Italy

Sanok

 Cestas, France
 Drohobych, Ukraine
 Gyöngyös, Hungary
 Humenné, Slovakia
 Kamianets-Podilskyi, Ukraine
 Östersund, Sweden
 Reinheim, Germany

Serock

 Balatonalmádi, Hungary
 Celleno, Italy
 Ignalina, Lithuania
 Lanškroun, Czech Republic

Siedlce

 Berdychiv, Ukraine
 Dasing, Germany
 Pescantina, Italy
 Sabinov, Slovakia
 Vilnius District Municipality, Lithuania

Siemianowice Śląskie

 Câmpia Turzii, Romania
 Jablunkov, Czech Republic
 Köthen, Germany
 Mohács, Hungary
 Wattrelos, France

Siemiatycze

 Castrolibero, Italy
 Etterbeek, Belgium
 Kobryn, Belarus
 Pastavy, Belarus
 Zehdenick, Germany

Sieradz

 Annemasse, France
 Gaggenau, Germany
 Gospić, Croatia
 Yambol, Bulgaria

Skarżysko-Kamienna

 Franklin Park, United States
 Kavarna, Bulgaria
 Stafford, England, United Kingdom
 Zhmerynka, Ukraine

Skawina

 Civitanova Marche, Italy
 Holešov, Czech Republic
 Hürth, Germany
 Peremyshliany, Ukraine
 Roztoky, Czech Republic
 Thetford, England, United Kingdom
 Turčianske Teplice, Slovakia

Skierniewice

 Châtelaillon-Plage, France
 Gera, Germany
 Levice, Slovakia
 Lubny, Ukraine
 Szentes, Hungary

Skoczów
 Hrádek, Czech Republic

Sl–Sr
Sława

 Esneux, Belgium
 Luckau, Germany

Słubice

 Frankfurt an der Oder, Germany
 Heilbronn, Germany
 Shostka, Ukraine

Słupsk

 Bari, Italy
 Bukhara, Uzbekistan
 Carlisle, England, United Kingdom
 Cartaxo, Portugal
 Flensburg, Germany
 Fredrikstad, Norway

 Ustka, Poland
 Vantaa, Finland
 Vordingborg, Denmark

Sochaczew

 Horodok, Ukraine
 Melton Mowbray, England, United Kingdom

Sokołów Podlaski

 Czerwionka-Leszczyny, Poland
 Dubno, Ukraine
 Jēkabpils, Latvia
 Kotelniki, Russia

Sopot

 Ashkelon, Israel
 Frankenthal, Germany
 Karlshamn, Sweden
 Næstved, Denmark

 Ratzeburg, Germany
 Southend-on-Sea, England, United Kingdom
 Zakopane, Poland

Sosnowiec

 Derhachi, Ukraine
 Dziwnów, Poland
 Idar-Oberstein, Germany
 Komárom, Hungary
 Maârif (Casablanca), Morocco
 Les Mureaux, France
 Roubaix, France
 Suceava, Romania

Śrem

 Bergen, Germany
 Rožnov pod Radhoštěm, Czech Republic
 Świdnik, Poland

Środa Śląska

 Kamianka-Buzka, Ukraine
 Saterland, Germany
 Štěpánov, Czech Republic

Środa Wielkopolska

 Behringen (Hörselberg-Hainich), Germany
 Hennigsdorf, Germany
 Hoyerswerda, Germany
 Kralupy nad Vltavou, Czech Republic
 Mohyliv-Podilskyi, Ukraine
 Prostějov, Czech Republic
 Vitré, France

St–Su
Stalowa Wola
 Liuzhou, China

Starachowice
 Heywood, England, United Kingdom

Stargard

 Elmshorn, Germany
 Saldus, Latvia 
 Stralsund, Germany
 Wijchen, Netherlands

Starogard Gdański

 Diepholz, Germany
 Foshan, China

Stary Sącz

 Chuhuiv, Ukraine
 Dunakeszi, Hungary
 Keszthely, Hungary
 Kosd, Hungary
 Lambres-lez-Douai, France
 Levoča, Slovakia
 Liptovský Hrádok, Slovakia
 Menconico, Italy

Strumień

 Dolní Domaslavice, Czech Republic
 Dolný Hričov, Slovakia
 Krasňany, Slovakia
 Petřvald, Czech Republic
 Šenov, Czech Republic
 Súľov-Hradná, Slovakia

Strzegom

 Auerbach, Germany
 Hořice, Czech Republic
 Pavullo nel Frignano, Italy
 Pidhaitsi, Ukraine

 Znojmo, Czech Republic

Strzelce Krajeńskie

 Angermünde, Germany
 Jammerbugt, Denmark
 Tornesch, Germany

Strzelce Opolskie

 Bandera, United States
 Druskininkai, Lithuania
 Holice, Czech Republic
 Soest, Germany
 Tysmenytsia, Ukraine

Strzelin

 Frankenberg, Germany
 Libchavy, Czech Republic
 Straelen, Germany
 Svitavy, Czech Republic
 Trutnov, Czech Republic

Strzyżów is a member of the Charter of European Rural Communities, a town twinning association across the European Union. Strzyżów also has several other twin towns.

Charter of European Rural Communities
 Bienvenida, Spain
 Bièvre, Belgium
 Bucine, Italy
 Cashel, Ireland
 Cissé, France
 Desborough, England, United Kingdom
 Esch (Haaren), Netherlands
 Hepstedt, Germany
 Ibănești, Romania
 Kandava (Tukums), Latvia
 Kannus, Finland
 Kolindros, Greece
 Lassee, Austria
 Medzev, Slovakia
 Moravče, Slovenia
 Næstved, Denmark
 Nagycenk, Hungary
 Nadur, Malta
 Ockelbo, Sweden
 Pano Lefkara, Cyprus
 Põlva, Estonia
 Samuel (Soure), Portugal
 Slivo Pole, Bulgaria
 Starý Poddvorov, Czech Republic
 Tisno, Croatia
 Troisvierges, Luxembourg
 Žagarė (Joniškis), Lithuania
Other
 Bagnacavallo, Italy
 Horodok, Ukraine
 Kisvárda, Hungary
 Namsos, Norway
 Svidník, Slovakia

Suchy Las

 Hnivan, Ukraine
 Isernhagen, Germany
 Poronin, Poland
 Tamási, Hungary

Sulechów

 Criuleni, Moldova
 Fürstenwalde, Germany
 Rushmoor, England, United Kingdom

Sulęcin

 Beeskow, Germany
 Friedland, Germany
 Kamen, Germany
 Nowy Tomyśl, Poland

Sulejówek

 Bourg-la-Reine, France
 Viimsi, Estonia
 Vilnius District Municipality, Lithuania
 Yalvaç, Turkey

Suwałki

 Alytus, Lithuania
 Grande-Synthe, France
 Marijampolė, Lithuania
 Notodden, Norway
 Võru, Estonia
 Waren, Germany

Sw
Swarzędz

 Duclair, France
 Ronnenberg, Germany

Świdnica

 Biberach an der Riss, Germany
 Ivano-Frankivsk, Ukraine
 Kazincbarcika, Hungary
 Nizhyn, Ukraine
 Police nad Metují, Czech Republic
 Švenčionys, Lithuania
 Trutnov, Czech Republic
 Tendring, England, United Kingdom

Świdnica (rural gmina)

 Ermont, France
 Lampertheim, Germany
 Maldegem, Belgium
 Żukowo, Poland
 Zviahel Raion, Ukraine

Świdnik

 Aalten, Netherlands
 Béthune, France
 Brindisi, Italy
 Radun, Belarus
 Rechytsa, Belarus

 Shostka, Ukraine
 Śrem, Poland
 Svidník, Slovakia
 Valjevo, Serbia
 Welwyn Hatfield, England, United Kingdom

Świebodzice

 Hrušov, Slovakia
 Jilemnice, Czech Republic
 Marjina Horka, Belarus
 Waldbröl, Germany

Świebodzin

 Friesoythe, Germany
 Herzberg, Germany
 Neuenhagen bei Berlin, Germany

Świecie

 Gernsheim, Germany
 Pieszyce, Poland

Świerzawa

 Chocz, Poland
 Kottmar, Germany
 Malá Skála, Czech Republic

Świętochłowice

 Heiloo, Netherlands
 Laa an der Thaya, Austria
 Nový Jičín, Czech Republic
 Rimavská Sobota, Slovakia
 Tai'an, China
 Tiszaújváros, Hungary
 Torez, Ukraine

Świnoujście

 Heringsdorf, Germany
 Nordenham, Germany
 Vorpommern-Greifswald, Germany
 Ystad, Sweden

Sy–Sz
Syców
 Malsch, Germany

Szamotuły

 Brignoles, France
 Bruneck, Italy
 Groß-Gerau, Germany
 Halderberge, Netherlands
 Mark, Sweden
 Tielt, Belgium

Szczecin

 Bari, Italy
 Bremerhaven, Germany
 Dnipro, Ukraine
 Esbjerg, Denmark
 Friedrichshain-Kreuzberg (Berlin), Germany
 Greifswald, Germany

 Kingston upon Hull, England, United Kingdom
 Klaipėda, Lithuania

 Malmö, Sweden
 Rostock, Germany
 St. Louis, United States

Szczecinek

 Bergen op Zoom, Netherlands
 Neustrelitz, Germany
 Noyelles-sous-Lens, France
 Söderhamn, Sweden

Szczekociny

 Adony, Hungary
 Jelšava, Slovakia

Szczytno

 Batočina, Serbia
 Herten, Germany
 Šalčininkai, Lithuania
 Żywiec, Poland

Szprotawa

 Gevelsberg, Germany
 Spremberg, Germany
 Uman, Ukraine

Sztum

 Kupiškis, Lithuania
 Polessk, Russia
 Ritterhude, Germany
 Val-de-Reuil, France

Szydłowiec

 Beynes, France
 Turda, Romania

T
Tarnobrzeg

 Banská Bystrica, Slovakia
 Chernihiv, Ukraine

 Zolochiv Raion, Ukraine

Tarnów

 Bila Tserkva, Ukraine
 Blackburn, England, United Kingdom
 Casalmaggiore, Italy
 Kiskőrös, Hungary
 Kotlas, Russia
 Nowy Sącz, Poland
 Schoten, Belgium
 Ternopil, Ukraine
 Trenčín, Slovakia
 Veszprém, Hungary

Tarnów (rural gmina)

 Jászalsószentgyörgy, Hungary
 Jászdózsa, Hungary
 Tornaľa, Slovakia

Tarnowo Podgórne

 Bardo, Poland
 Cologno al Serio, Italy
 Fronreute, Germany
 Līvāni, Latvia
 Noordenveld, Netherlands
 Rohrdorf, Germany
 Šalčininkai, Lithuania
 Ukmergė, Lithuania

Tarnowskie Góry

 Békéscsaba, Hungary
 Bernburg, Germany
 Kutná Hora, Czech Republic
 Méricourt, France

Tczew

 Aizkraukle, Latvia
 Barking and Dagenham, England, United Kingdom
 Beauvais, France
 Biržai, Lithuania
 Chornomorsk, Ukraine
 Dębno, Poland

 Lev HaSharon, Israel

 Werder, Germany
 Witten, Germany

Tomaszów Mazowiecki

 Hîncești, Moldova
 Ivano-Frankivsk, Ukraine
 Linares, Spain
 Mionica, Serbia
 Polonezköy (Beykoz), Turkey

Toruń

 Angers, France
 Čadca, Slovakia
 Göttingen, Germany
 Guilin, China
 Hämeenlinna, Finland
 Kaunas, Lithuania
 Leiden, Netherlands
 Lutsk, Ukraine
 Novo Mesto, Slovenia
 Philadelphia, United States
 Swindon, England, United Kingdom

Trzcianka

 Berwick-upon-Tweed, England, United Kingdom
 Duszniki-Zdrój, Poland
 Husum, Germany
 Lehrte, Germany
 Tomashpil, Ukraine

Trzebiatów

 Brwinów, Poland
 Großräschen, Germany
 Istebna, Poland
 Sjöbo, Sweden
 Wandlitz, Germany

Trzebinia

 Billy-Montigny, France
 Bönen, Germany
 Ishøj, Denmark
 Reggello, Italy

Trzebnica

 Kitzingen, Germany
 Vynnyky, Ukraine

Tuchola

 Kudowa-Zdrój, Poland
 Lübtheen, Germany
 Olching, Germany

Tuchów

 Baranivka, Ukraine
 Detva, Slovakia
 Illingen, Germany
 Martfű, Hungary
 Mikulov, Czech Republic
 Pettenbach, Austria

 Tăuții-Măgherăuș, Romania

Turek

 Dunaivtsi, Ukraine
 Rovinari, Romania
 Turhal, Turkey
 Uniejów, Poland
 Wiesmoor, Germany

Tychy

 Cassino, Italy

 Marzahn-Hellersdorf (Berlin), Germany

U
Ustka

 Bielsko-Biała, Poland
 Homécourt, France
 Kappeln, Germany
 Palanga, Lithuania
 Słupsk, Poland

Ustroń

 Frenštát pod Radhoštěm, Czech Republic
 Hajdúnánás, Hungary
 Kalety, Poland
 Luhačovice, Czech Republic
 Neukirchen-Vluyn, Germany
 Piešťany, Slovakia
 Újbuda (Budapest), Hungary
 Ustronie Morskie, Poland

W

Wa–Wi
Wadowice

 Assisi, Italy
 Canale d'Agordo, Italy
 Carpineto Romano, Italy
 Chicago Heights, United States
 Kecskemét, Hungary
 Marktl, Germany
 Pietrelcina, Italy
 San Giovanni Rotondo, Italy
 Sona, Italy

Wągrowiec

 Adendorf, Germany
 Gyula, Hungary
 Krasnogorsk, Russia
 Le Plessis-Trévise, France
 Schönwalde-Glien, Germany

Wałbrzych

 Boryslav, Ukraine
 Cape Breton, Canada
 Foggia, Italy
 Freiberg, Germany
 Gżira, Malta
 Hradec Králové, Czech Republic
 Jastarnia, Poland
 Vannes, France

Wałcz

 Åstorp, Sweden
 Bad Essen, Germany
 Bailleul, France
 Kyritz, Germany
 Werne, Germany 

Warsaw

 Astana, Kazakhstan
 Berlin, Germany
 Chicago, United States
 Düsseldorf, Germany
 Hanoi, Vietnam
 Kyiv, Ukraine
 Riga, Latvia
 Rio de Janeiro, Brazil
 Seoul, South Korea
 Taipei, Taiwan
 Tel Aviv, Israel
 Vilnius, Lithuania

Warta

 Szécsény, Hungary
 Tundzha, Bulgaria

Węgierska Górka

 Lengyeltóti, Hungary
 Pákozd, Hungary

Węgorzewo

 Leffrinckoucke, France
 Rotenburg an der Wümme, Germany
 Vilnius District Municipality, Lithuania
 Yavoriv, Ukraine

Węgrów

 Rokytne, Ukraine
 Skole, Ukraine
 Švenčionys, Lithuania
 Valsolda, Italy

Wieliczka

 Bergkamen, Germany
 Litovel, Czech Republic
 Saint-André-lez-Lille, France
 Sesto Fiorentino, Italy

Wieliszew

 Agios Stefanos, Greece
 Graffignano, Italy
 Mielno, Poland
 Salaspils, Latvia
 Siret, Romania
 Trittau (Amt), Germany

Wieluń

 Adelebsen, Germany
 Osterburg, Germany

Wilamowice

 Dolní Benešov, Czech Republic
 Horná Súča, Slovakia
 Kisújszállás, Hungary
 Klanjec, Croatia
 Kloštar Ivanić, Croatia
 Kunerad, Slovakia
 Rajecké Teplice, Slovakia
 Trenčianske Teplice, Slovakia
 Županja, Croatia

Wilkowice

 Bziny, Slovakia
 Krásná, Czech Republic
 Likavka, Slovakia
 Lubiewo, Poland

Wisła

 Bully-les-Mines, France
 Čoka, Serbia
 Hukvaldy, Czech Republic
 Nepomuk, Czech Republic
 Rheinhausen, Germany
 Turčianske Teplice, Slovakia

Wl–Wy
Władysławowo

 Lamstedt, Germany
 Maków Podhalański, Poland
 Scalea, Italy

Włocławek

 Bedford, England, United Kingdom
 Izmail, Ukraine
 Saint-Avold, France

Wodzisław Śląski

 Alanya, Turkey
 Artik, Armenia
 Gladbeck, Germany
 Karviná, Czech Republic
 Sallaumines, France
 Siret, Romania

Wolbrom

 Domaszék, Hungary
 Waltershausen, Germany

Wołomin
 Csepel (Budapest), Hungary

Wołów

 Buchholz in der Nordheide, Germany
 Canteleu, France

Wolsztyn

 Bad Bevensen, Germany
 Domont, France
 Lityn, Ukraine
 Lübben, Germany
 Mór, Hungary
 Neunkirchen, Germany
 Peel en Maas, Netherlands

Wrocław

 Batumi, Georgia
 Breda, Netherlands
 Charlotte, United States
 Dresden, Germany
 Guadalajara, Mexico
 Hradec Králové, Czech Republic
 Kaunas, Lithuania
 Lille, France
 Lviv, Ukraine
 Oxford, England, United Kingdom
 Ramat Gan, Israel
 Reykjavík, Iceland
 Vienne, France

 Wiesbaden, Germany

Wronki

 Beverwijk, Netherlands
 Cookstown, Northern Ireland, United Kingdom
 Lentvaris (Trakai), Lithuania
 Plérin, France

Września

 Garbsen, Germany
 Nottingham, England, United Kingdom

Wschowa
 Šalčininkai, Lithuania

Wyszków

 Kohtla-Järve, Estonia
 Vyshhorod, Ukraine

Z

Za
Zabierzów

 Camas, United States
 Hillsboro, United States
 Hruštín, Slovakia
 Krapkowice, Poland
 Morawica, Poland

Ząbkowice Śląskie

 Bran, Romania
 Červený Kostelec, Czech Republic
 Fontenay-aux-Roses, France
 Sławno, Poland
 Uchte, Germany
 Wiesloch, Germany

Żabno
 Bad Berka, Germany

Zabrze

 Essen, Germany
 Lund, Sweden
 Rivne, Ukraine
 Rotherham, England, United Kingdom
 Rovereto, Italy
 Sangerhausen, Germany
 Seclin, France
 Trnava, Slovakia
 Zahlé, Lebanon

Żagań

 Duns, Scotland, United Kingdom
 Netphen, Germany
 Ortrand, Germany
 Saint-Omer, France
 Teltow, Germany

Zakopane

 Bansko, Bulgaria
 Polonezköy (Beykoz), Turkey
 Poprad, Slovakia
 Saint-Dié-des-Vosges, France
 Siegen, Germany
 Sopot, Poland
 Stryi, Ukraine
 Vysoké Tatry, Slovakia

Zambrów
 Visaginas, Lithuania

Zamość

 Bardejov, Slovakia
 Fountain Hills, United States
 Loughborough, England, United Kingdom
 Lutsk, Ukraine
 Schwäbisch Hall, Germany
 Sighișoara, Romania
 Weimar, Germany 
 Zhovkva, Ukraine

Żarów

 Lohmar, Germany
 Nymburk, Czech Republic
 Újfehértó, Hungary

Żary

 Gárdony, Hungary
 Longuyon, France
 Weißwasser, Germany

Zawadzkie

 Bockenem, Germany
 Chortkiv, Ukraine
 Dubnica nad Váhom, Slovakia
 Otrokovice, Czech Republic
 Uebigau-Wahrenbrück, Germany
 Vác, Hungary

Zawiercie

 Bornheim, Germany
 Dolný Kubín, Slovakia
 Ebensee, Austria
 Kamianets-Podilskyi, Ukraine
 Ponte Lambro, Italy
 Zsámbék, Hungary

Zb–Zi
Zbąszyń

 Brieskow-Finkenheerd, Germany
 Kłodzko (rural gmina), Poland
 Schleife, Germany
 Zbąszynek, Poland

Zbrosławice

 Brackenheim, Germany
 Castagnole delle Lanze, Italy
 Charnay-lès-Mâcon, France
 Tarnalelesz, Hungary

Zduńska Wola

 Pietrasanta, Italy
 Valmiera, Latvia
 Zarasai, Lithuania

Zdzieszowice
 Lipník nad Bečvou, Czech Republic

Zebrzydowice
 Petrovice u Karviné, Czech Republic

Zgierz

 Bischwiller, France
 Glauchau, Germany
 Hódmezővásárhely, Hungary
 Jihlava, Czech Republic
 Kežmarok, Slovakia
 Kupiškis, Lithuania
 Manevychi Raion, Ukraine
 Orzysz, Poland
 Supraśl, Poland

Zgorzelec

 Avion, France
 Görlitz, Germany
 Myrhorod, Ukraine
 Naousa, Greece

Ziębice

 Brighton, United States
 Ebreichsdorf, Austria
 Jaroměř, Czech Republic

Zielona Góra

 L'Aquila, Italy
 Bistriţa, Romania
 Cottbus, Germany
 Helmond, Netherlands
 Ivano-Frankivsk, Ukraine
 Kraljevo, Serbia
 Nitra, Slovakia
 Troyes, France
 Verden an der Aller, Germany
 Vitebsk, Belarus
 Wuxi, China
 Zittau, Germany

Zielonki
 Hersin-Coupigny, France

Zl–Zy
Złocieniec

 Bad Segeberg, Germany
 Drawsko Pomorskie, Poland
 Koserow, Germany
 Pyrzyce, Poland

Złotoryja

 Buchach, Ukraine
 Mimoň, Czech Republic
 Pulsnitz, Germany
 Westerburg, Germany

Złotów

 Eggesin, Germany
 La Flèche, France

 Goole, England, United Kingdom
 Nyasvizh, Belarus
 Rathenow, Germany

Żmigród
 Bargteheide, Germany

Żnin

 Albertirsa, Hungary
 Birštonas, Lithuania
 Malacky, Slovakia

 Šalčininkai, Lithuania
 Veselí nad Moravou, Czech Republic

Żory

 Kamp-Lintfort, Germany
 Mezőkövesd, Hungary
 Pasvalys, Lithuania
 Montceau-les-Mines, France
 Tetiiv, Ukraine

Żukowo

 Balvi, Latvia
 Saint-Junien, France
 Świdnica (rural gmina), Poland
 Wendelstein, Germany

Żychlin
 Brody, Ukraine

Żyrardów

 Delčevo, North Macedonia
 Krásná Lípa, Czech Republic
 Lourmarin, France
 Tangshan, China
 Tryavna, Bulgaria

Żywiec

 Adur, England, United Kingdom

 Čadca, Slovakia
 Feldbach, Austria
 Gödöllő, Hungary
 Liptovský Mikuláš, Slovakia
 Opava, Czech Republic
 Riom, France
 Storuman, Sweden
 Szczytno, Poland
 Unterhaching, Germany

References

Poland
Poland geography-related lists
Cities and towns in Poland
Foreign relations of Poland
Populated places in Poland